Tamoyaigee Ebecha   is a 2013 Indian Meitei language film written and directed by Pilu Heigrujam and produced by Radha and Sunita Keinou. It stars Gurumayum Bonny and Bala Hijam in the titular roles. The film was released at Bhagyachandra Open Air Theatre (BOAT), Imphal, on 27 December 2013. 
Initially, the film was banned by Film Forum Manipur and MEELAL, the reason being containing vulgar lyrics in the song Sire Sire Nungaibana Sire. It was then changed from Sire Sire Nungaibana Sire to Sire Sire Nungshibana Sire.

Cast
 Gurumayum Bonny as Tamoyai
 Bala Hijam as Ebecha
 Sonia Hijam
 Vidyananda Laishram as Shanou
 Wangkhem Lalitkumar
 Narendra Ningomba
 Longjam Ongbi Lalitabi
 Philem Puneshori
 Bebeto

Soundtrack
Sorri Senjam and Bishow Ch. Composed the soundtrack for the film and Khaidem Imo and Paresh wrote the lyrics. The songs are titled Sire Sire Nungshibana Sire and Mikup Khuding. The playback singers are Raj Elangbam, Surma Chanu and Chitra Pangabam. The song  Sire Sire Nungshibana Sire became popular among the youth.

References

2010s Meitei-language films
2013 films